Bellefosse is a commune in the Bas-Rhin department in Grand Est in northeastern France, historically and culturally part of Alsace.

Geography 
It is dominated by the ruins of the Château de la Roche towering above it.

Toponymy 
1434: Belfus
1534: Belfuss
1578: Belfos
1584: Belfuß
1782: Belfus
1793: Bellefosse
1915-1918: Schöngrund
Originating from the Celtic words bill (small) and fois (place).

History 
Bellefosse is part of the old Ban de la Roche fief. The village's name was formalized as Belfus in 1434. It was composed of 25 houses in 1578, under the name of belfos then.

On 1 April 1974, it fused with Waldersbach and Belmont to form the commune of Ban-de-Roche, in reference to the historical fief, Fouday was added to the commune in 1975. On 1 January 1992, the commune of Bellefosse was reestablished.

Coat of Arms 

The heraldics of Bellefosse are blazoned:
"Azure with one golden chevron followed by three silver cramps set in pale."

Population

See also
Communes of the Bas-Rhin department

References

Communes of Bas-Rhin
Bas-Rhin communes articles needing translation from French Wikipedia